Liva is the first live album released by the Norwegian band Gåte, and was recorded on December 30, 2005 at Rockefeller Music Hall, Oslo, Norway.

Track listing
"Knut Liten og Sylvelin"
"Kjærleik"
"Følgje"
"Venelite"
"Du som er ung"
"Stengd dør"
"Liti Kjersti"
"Fredlysning"
"Bendik og Årolilja"
"Margit Hjukse"
"Sjå attende"

Charts

References

2006 live albums
Gåte albums